Hong Kong Nocturne (香江花月夜) is a 1967 Hong Kong Shaw Brothers musical film directed by Umetsugu Inoue.

Plot 
The Chia sisters (Cheng Pei-pei, Lily Ho and Chin Ping)
perform as the backup troupe with their magician father (Chiang Kuang-Chao). The selfish old man has little regard for his daughters and squanders their hard earned money on a young floozy who plays him for a fool. After winning a go-go dance contest, the girls ditch their father and pursue their dreams.

Cast
 
 Chan Hei		
 Chao Hsin Yen		
 Cheng Kang-Yeh - Wang Ying
 Cheng Pei-pei - Chia Chuen-Chuen 
 Chiang Kuang Chao - Chia Szu-Chen
  - Chia Ting-Ting 
 Tina Fei Chin - Hsiao Hua
 Fan Dan - Promoter
 Lily Ho - Chia Tsui-Tsui  
  - Chen Tze-Ching
 Ku Feng - Janitor at ballet school
 Li Hao		
 Ling Yun - Fang Yun-Tai
 Li Yunzhong - Japanese film director (as Yun-Chung Li)
 Lui Ming		
 Ouyang Sha-fei - Chen Tze-Ching's mother
 Tien Feng - Yen Fang
 Tien Shun - Mr. Chen
 Wu Chun-li		
 Wu Wei		
 Yueh Hua

See also
 Hong Kong Rhapsody (1968)

References

External links
 
 Hong Kong Cinemagic entry
 Hong Kong Nocturne at hkmdb.com

1967 films
Hong Kong musical films
1960s Mandarin-language films
Shaw Brothers Studio films
1967 musical films